Schleswig station is the station of the city of Schleswig in the German state of Schleswig-Holstein. It is located on the Neumünster–Flensburg and Husum–Jübek-Schleswig–Kiel lines.  It is currently operated by Deutsche Bahn, which classifies it as a category 5 station.

History 
Formerly, the station was connected to Schleswig Altstadt station by a three kilometre-long line of the Schleswig District Railway, which connected to lines to Satrup, Kappeln via Süderbrarup and to Friedrichstadt.

Operations 

In long-distance traffic, since 9 December 2007, daily Intercity-Express trains on the Aarhus–Hamburg–Berlin route have stopped in Schleswig, but this service ended in December 2015 and was replaced by DSB (railway company) EuroCity trains, which do not stop in Schleswig. Only a few InterCity services remain, mainly in the weekends.

DB Regionalbahn Schleswig Holstein (RB-SH) operates hourly Regional-Express services between Hamburg and Flensburg as well as between Husum and Kiel.

Tracks 
The station has three tracks, two of which have a platform that is used for passenger operations. Trains operate as follows:
Platform 1: Long-distance trains to Flensburg, RB-SH regional services to Flensburg and Husum
 Platform 3: Long-distance trains to Hamburg, RB-SH regional services to Hamburg and Kiel

Notes

External links 

Railway stations in Schleswig-Holstein
Schleswig, Schleswig-Holstein
Railway stations in Germany opened in 1869
Buildings and structures in Schleswig-Flensburg